Palumbina albilustra is a moth of the family Gelechiidae. It was described by Walia and Wadahawan in 2004. It is found in northern India.

References

Moths described in 2004
Palumbina